Valeri Nikolayevich Glushakov (March 17, 1959 in Enthusiast sovkhoz, Nura District, Karagandy Province – March 29, 2017) was a Russian professional football player and coach. He made his professional debut in the Soviet First League in 1977 for FC Spartak Moscow.

Personal life
He was the uncle of Denis Glushakov.

Honours
 Soviet Top League champion: 1979.
 Veikkausliiga champion: 1991.
 Veikkausliiga runner-up: 1992.

References

1959 births
2017 deaths
Soviet footballers
Russian footballers
Russian football managers
Soviet Top League players
FC Spartak Moscow players
FC Asmaral Moscow players
Pakhtakor Tashkent FK players
PFC CSKA Moscow players
Russian Premier League players
FC SKA Rostov-on-Don players
FC Lahti players
Veikkausliiga players
Soviet expatriate footballers
Russian expatriate footballers
Expatriate footballers in Finland
Expatriate footballers in Kazakhstan
Russian expatriate sportspeople in Kazakhstan
Association football midfielders
Association football defenders